Vojslavice is a municipality and village in Pelhřimov District in the Vysočina Region of the Czech Republic. It has about 90 inhabitants.

Etymology
The name is derived from the personal name Vojslav, meaning "the village of Vojslav's people".

Geography
It lies in the Křemešník Highlands. The municipality is situated in a meander of the river Želivka, on the shore of the Švihov Reservoir built on the Želivka.

History
The first written mention of Vojslavice is from 1318.

Transport
The D1 motorway from Prague to Brno passes through the municipality.

Sights
The landmark of Vojslavice is the Church of the Assumption of the Virgin Mary. It is a simple pilgrimage church built on the site of an old medieval church. It was built in 1670 and modified in 1721–1723.

References

External links

Villages in Pelhřimov District